Spanish Camp, also known as Spanish Colony, was a private cooperative community on the shore of Staten Island, one of the five boroughs of New York City. It existed from the 1920s to the first decade of the 21st century, when it was demolished.

History
Spanish Camp was started in 1923 by immigrants from Spain, most of whom were anarchists, who organized under the name Spanish Naturopath Association.  The  property was located facing lower New York Bay on the southeastern shore of Staten Island, off Poillon Avenue near the neighborhood of Annadale. The group of cottages had its own streets and services, independent of anything having to do with the rest of Staten Island and New York City. A small pond and associated wetlands were included. A small beach faced the bay, adjacent to an ornate picnic area and athletic field. Roman Catholic activist Dorothy Day lived for years in one of the cottages. 

In 2000 the grandchildren and great grandchildren of the founders sold the property for $7.1 million to a developer, John DiScala, against the will of most residents.  Residents owned their homes, but the land was the property of the Spanish Naturopath Association, whose members were descendants of the founders. Residents were forced out, but the developer was blocked by various court actions brought by former residents, and by refusal of the City Planning Department to issue permits for construction.  The developer had promised to preserve the home Dorothy Day had lived in, and a few sample other areas.  However, her former home was leveled by a bulldozer as the New York City Landmarks Preservation Commission was about to declare it a historic landmark, and the developer then claimed there was no evidence she had ever been near the property.

As of 2006 DiScala's firm had declared bankruptcy, and he was trying to sell the otherwise vacant land to other developers.

References

Further reading

Anarchist communities
Anarchist culture
Anarchist organizations in the United States
Cooperatives in the United States
Political history of the United States
Buildings and structures in Staten Island
History of Staten Island
Neighborhoods in Staten Island
1923 establishments in New York City
2000 disestablishments in New York (state)